This was the first edition of the tournament.

Hiroki Moriya won the title after defeating James Ward 6–2, 7–5 in the final.

Seeds

Draw

Finals

Top half

Bottom half

References
Main Draw
Qualifying Draw

Loughborough Trophy - Singles